Robin de Kruijf  (born 5 May 1991) is a Dutch volleyball player for Imoco Volley and Netherlands national team.
Robin de Kruijf made her debut in the Dutch national team in the Dutch opening match of the Montreux Volley Masters against Cuba in June 2008 at the age of 22.
In 2016 De Kruijf and her team won bronze in the World Grand Prix and ended on a historical fourth place in the Rio Olympics.

Awards

Individual
 2019 FIVB Volleyball Women's Club World Championship "Best Middle Blocker"
 2021 FIVB Volleyball Women's Club World Championship "Best Middle Blocker"

Clubs
 2008–09 Dutch League -  Champion, with Martinus
 2008–09 Dutch Cup -  Champion, with Martinus
 2009 Dutch Supercup -  Champion, with TVC Amstelveen
 2009–10 Dutch League -  Champions, with TVC Amstelveen
 2009–10 Dutch Cup -  Champion, with TVC Amstelveen
 2013 Italian Supercup -  Champion, with River Volley
 2013–14 Italian League -  Champion, with River Volley
 2013-14 Italian Cup -  Champion, with River Volley
 2014 Turkish Supercup -  Champion, with VakıfBank
 2015–16 Turkish League -  Champion, with VakıfBank
 2016 Italian Supercup -  Champion, with Imoco Volley Conegliano
 2016-17 Italian Cup (Coppa Italia) -  Champion, with Imoco Volley Conegliano
 2016–17 CEV Champions League -  Runner-Up, with Imoco Volley Conegliano
 2017–18 Italian League -  Champion, with Imoco Volley Conegliano
 2018 Italian Supercup -  Champion, with Imoco Volley Conegliano
 2018–19 Italian League -  Champion, with Imoco Volley Conegliano
 2018–19 CEV Champions League -  Runner-Up, with Imoco Volley Conegliano
 2019 Italian Supercup -  Champion, with Imoco Volley Conegliano
 2019 FIVB Volleyball Women's Club World Championship -  Champion, with Imoco Volley Conegliano
 2019-20 Italian Cup (Coppa Italia) -  Champion, with Imoco Volley Conegliano
 2020 Italian Supercup -  Champions, with Imoco Volley Conegliano
 2020-21 Italian Cup (Coppa Italia) -  Champion, with Imoco Volley Conegliano
 2020–21 Italian League -  Champion, with Imoco Volley Conegliano
 2020–21 CEV Women's Champions League -  Champion, with Imoco Volley Conegliano
 2021 Italian Supercup -  Champions, with Imoco Volley Conegliano
 2021-22 Italian Cup (Coppa Italia) -  Champion, with Imoco Volley Conegliano
 2021–22 Italian League -  Champion, with Imoco Volley Conegliano

Personal life
De Kruijf grew up in Schalkwijk. She has two younger brothers.

External links
FIVB profile

1991 births
Living people
Dutch women's volleyball players
Dutch expatriate sportspeople in Germany
Dutch expatriate sportspeople in Italy
Dutch expatriate sportspeople in Turkey
European Games competitors for the Netherlands
Expatriate volleyball players in Germany
Expatriate volleyball players in Italy
Expatriate volleyball players in Turkey
Volleyball players at the 2015 European Games
Volleyball players at the 2016 Summer Olympics
People from Nieuwegein
VakıfBank S.K. volleyballers
Middle blockers
Olympic volleyball players of the Netherlands
Sportspeople from Utrecht (province)
21st-century Dutch women